The West Texas–New Mexico League was a minor league baseball league that operated from 1937 through 1955, with a hiatus from 1943 to 1945 during World War II. The league started as a Class D level league, upgraded to Class C in 1946 and then a final advancement to Class B level status in 1955. League franchises were based exclusively in New Mexico and Texas.

History
The West Texas–New Mexico League began play in 1937 as a Class D level league, with Milton Price serving as president. The Hobbs Drillers, Midland Cardinals, Monahans Trojans, Odessa Oilers, Roswell Sunshiners and Wink Spudders were the charter members in beginning league play on May 4, 1937.

The Lubbock Hubbers (1938, 1939, 1947), Albuquerque Dukes (1949, 1950, 1953) and Pampa Oilers (1946, 1954, 1955) each won three league championships.

Cities represented
Abilene, Texas: Abilene Apaches 1939; Abilene Blue Sox 1946–1955
Albuquerque, New Mexico: Albuquerque Dukes 1942; Albuquerque Dukes 1946–1955, moved to Western League 1956–1958
Amarillo, Texas: Amarillo Gold Sox 1939–1942; Amarillo Gold Sox 1946–1955, moved to Western League 1956–1958
Big Spring, Texas: Big Spring Barons 1938–1940; Big Spring Bombers 1941; Big Spring Pirates 1942
Borger, Texas: Borger Gassers 1939–1942, 1946–1954
Clovis, New Mexico: Clovis Pioneers 1938–1942, 1946–1955, moved to Southwestern League 1956
El Paso, Texas: El Paso Texans 1955, moved to Southwestern League 1956–1957, moved from Arizona–Texas League 1952–1954
Hobbs, New Mexico: Hobbs Drillers 1937; Hobbs Boosters 1938
Lamesa, Texas: Lamesa Lobos 1939–1941; Lamesa Dodgers1942; Lamesa Lobos 1946–1952
Lubbock, Texas: Lubbock Hubbers 1938–1942, 1946–1955, moved to Big State League 1956–1958
Midland, Texas: Midland Cardinals 1937–1938; Midland Cowboys 1939–1940
Monahans, Texas: Monahans Trojans 1937
Odessa, Texas: Odessa Oilers 1937, 1940
Pampa, Texas: Pampa Oilers 1939–1942, 1946–1955, moved to Southwestern League 1956–1957
Plainview, Texas: Plainview Ponies 1953–1955, moved to Southwestern League 1956–1957
Roswell, New Mexico: Roswell Sunshiners1937
Wichita Falls, Texas: Wichita Falls Spudders 1941–1942
Wink, Texas: Wink Spudders 1937–1938

Standings & statistics

1937 to 1942
1937 West Texas-New Mexico League - https://www.newspapers.com/clip/61517715/1937-west-texas-new-mexico-league/ schedule] 
 Odessa withdrew June 17; Midland withdrew July 9. Playoffs: Wink 3 games, Hobbs 0: Roswell 3 games, Monahans 2; Finals: Wink 3 games, Roswell 0. 
 

1938 West Texas-New Mexico League - schedule
 Playoffs: Lubbock 3 games, Wink 0: Clovis 3 games, Midland 1.  Finals: Lubbock 4 games, Clovis 1. Total league attendance, 108,342 

 
1939 West Texas-New Mexico League - schedule
Total league attendance, 273,374Abilene  moved to Borger July 9. Playoffs: Lubbock 3 games, Big Spring 0: Pampa 3 games, Lamesa 2.  Finals: Lubbock 4 games, Pampa 1. 
 
1940 West Texas-New Mexico League - schedule 
 Total league attendance, 240,679 Big Spring moved to Odessa June 20. Playoffs: Borger 3 games, Pampa 0: Lubbock 3 games, Amarillo 0.  Finals: Borger 4 games, Lubbock 3. 
 
1941 West Texas-New Mexico League - schedule
 Total Attendance, 183,395. Playoffs: Big Spring 3 games, Amarillo 0: Clovis 3 games, Borger 2.  Finals: Clovis 4 games, Big Spring 3. 
 
1942 West Texas-New Mexico League - schedule
 Wichita Falls moved to Big Spring May 22. The Pirates withdrew June 20.; Albuquerque withdrew June 23. The league disbanded July 25.

References

External links
Baseball Reference

Sources
The Encyclopedia of Minor League Baseball, Second Edition.

Defunct minor baseball leagues in the United States
Baseball leagues in Texas
1937 establishments in New Mexico
1937 establishments in Texas
1955 disestablishments in New Mexico
1955 disestablishments in Texas
Defunct professional sports leagues in the United States
Sports leagues established in 1937
Sports leagues disestablished in 1955
Baseball leagues in New Mexico